Watts is plural for watt, the unit of power.

Watts may also refer to:

People
Watts (surname), list of people with the surname Watts

Fictional characters
Watts, main character in the film Some Kind of Wonderful
Watts family, six characters in the TV series EastEnders
Curly Watts, in the ITV soap opera Coronation Street
Peter Watts, in the TV series Millennium
Raquel Watts, in the ITV soap opera Coronation Street
Wade Owen Watts, protagonist in the novel Ready Player One and its film adaption.

Places

United Kingdom
 Watts Bank, a nature reserve in Berkshire, England.
 Watts Hill, Dorset, England. 
 Watts Mortuary Chapel, Surrey, England
 Watts Naval School, Norfolk, England
 Watts Warehouse, Manchester, England

United States
 Watts, Los Angeles, California, a city district
 Watts, California, former city that was supplanted by Watts, Los Angeles
 Watts Station, historic train station in Watts, Los Angeles
 Watts Towers, 17 sculptural towers in Watts, Los Angeles
 Watts, Oklahoma
 Watts, Virginia
 Watts Bar Lake, Tennessee
 Watts Branch (Anacostia River), a tributary of the Anacostia in Maryland and the District of Columbia
 Watts Branch (Potomac River), a tributary of the Potomac in Maryland
 Watts Building (Birmingham, Alabama), on the National Register of Historic Places
 Watts Community, Oklahoma
 Watts Hospital, the first hospital in Durham, North Carolina
 Watts Island Light, a lighthouse in Chesapeake Bay
 Watts Township, Perry County, Pennsylvania

In space
 1798 Watts, an asteroid
 Watts (crater), on the Moon

In other places
 Watts River, Victoria, Australia
 Watts Point, British Columbia, Canada

Businesses and organizations
 Watts & Co., an English architecture and interior design company founded in 1874
 Watts Gallery, an art gallery in Surrey, England
 Watts Line, former rail line in Los Angeles, California

Other uses 

 USS Watts (DD-567), a U.S. Navy destroyer
 Watt's drill, a drill bit that is a type of mortiser
 Watts family murders
 Watt's linkage, mechanical linkage invented by James Watt
 Watts riots, a 1965 civil disturbance in Watts, Los Angeles
 Watts truce, a 1992 peace agreement among rival street gangs in Watts, Los Angeles

See also
Watt (disambiguation)
WATS (disambiguation)
WAT (disambiguation)